"Another Day" is a song by the American progressive metal band Dream Theater, released in their 1992 album Images and Words. It was released as the album's second and final single in 1993.

Background 
The song was written by guitarist John Petrucci. He wrote it about his father, John Petrucci Sr. who was diagnosed with cancer. Petrucci Sr. would be the subject of another Dream Theater song, "Take Away My Pain" following his death. The video for Another Day follows the song's lyrics, with a father and son spending time together. MRI scans are visible in the background, tying in to the cancer theme.

Track listing

Personnel 
Dream Theater
James LaBrie – lead vocals
John Petrucci – guitars, background vocals
Kevin Moore – keyboards
John Myung – bass
Mike Portnoy – drums, percussion

Additional musicians
Jay Beckenstein – soprano saxophone on "Another Day"

Production
David Prater – production, mixing 
Doug Oberkircher – engineer, mixing
Steve Regina – assistant engineer
Ted Jensen – mastering at Sterling Sound, New York

Charts

References 

Songs about death
Dream Theater songs
1992 songs
1993 singles
Heavy metal ballads
Songs written by John Petrucci
Atco Records singles
Songs written by Mike Portnoy
Songs written by James LaBrie
Songs written by John Myung